Moreni is a municipality in Dâmbovița County, Muntenia, Romania, with a population of 22,868. The city is in the eastern part of the county, on the border with Prahova County.

History

In 1861, Moreni became the first place in Romania (and third in the world) where oil was extracted.

Recently, an industrial park was built by the local authorities to encourage investment in the area.

Natives
 Gheorghe Barbu
 Constantin Herold
 Andrei Ivan
 Ralph S. Locher
 George Mihăiță
 Ștefan Niculescu
 Gabriel Paraschiv
 
 Ionuț Zaharia

References

External links

 Photos from Moreni

Populated places in Dâmbovița County
Localities in Muntenia
Cities in Romania
Monotowns in Romania